The Big Dam Film Festival is an annual event organized by Young Professionals of the Quincy Area, a Non-Profit Networking and Community Development organization in Quincy, Illinois. The festival features independent films from around the world in a showcase format usually held on a Saturday evening during the spring.

The proceeds from the event are used to organize and support events and endeavors throughout the community of Quincy, Illinois.

Origins
The Big Dam Film Festival was established by Clinton Begley and Christopher Mackenzie, who are both natives of Quincy, Illinois and members of the Young Professionals of Quincy board.

The festival is named after Lock and dam, #21 on the Mississippi river which is an icon local to Quincy, and a source of revenue for the city.

The inaugural event occurred in February 2006, featuring 23 films selected from over 80 total films that were submitted for selection. A short video introduction by Ed Begley, Jr. began the event.

History
Since its inception, each event has sold out well in advance. It has been subject to rave reviews and praise.

Clinton Begley and Christopher Mackenzie actively participated in the planning and coordination of the events throughout the transitional year of 2009 when a sub-committee of Young Professional's Quincy took over the majority of planning. Begley and Mackenzie have since divested themselves of planning future festivals.

The 2010 festival, under direction of the newly formed committee, saw a change in direction and format. Instead of a single evening of short films, two separate evenings of feature-length films were shown. Locally produced "Hampshire" was screened on Thursday, May 7 at McHugh Theater on the campus of Quincy University. Friday night hosted locally produced short " A night in Woodlawn" and critically acclaimed An Education as the feature presentation.

In 2011, the two-night format was retained and the feature-length documentary "Beer Wars" was screened Friday night while the original "shorts" festival was preserved for Saturday night at the State Room.

Festivals

External links
The Big Dam Film Festival Official Site
Young Professionals Quincy Official site

Film festivals in Illinois